Wang Qingxian (born July 1963) is a Chinese politician and the current governor of Anhui. He entered the workforce in July 1983, and joined the Chinese Communist Party in August 1986.

He was a delegate to the 12th National People's Congress. He is a delegate to the 13th National People's Congress.

Early life and education
Wang was born in Yongnian County, Hebei, in July 1963. After the resumption of college entrance examination, he was admitted to Nankai University in September 1979, where he majored in philosophy. After graduating in July 1983, he was dispatched to Heilongjiang Daily as an assistant reporter. In September 1987, he entered the Graduate School of Chinese Academy of Social Sciences, where he obtained a Master of Laws degree. In July 1990, he joined the People's Daily Economic Department as an editor and senior reporter. He served as deputy editor in chief in May 1996, and three years later promoted to the editor in chief position. During this period, he earned his doctor's degree in economic from the Graduate School of Chinese Academy of Social Sciences in July 2003.

Political career
Wang entered politics in September 2004 in north China's Shanxi province. He successively served as deputy secretary general of Shanxi government, director of the Research Office of Shanxi government, executive deputy head of the Propaganda Department of the CPC Shanxi Provincial Committee, and party branch secretary of the General Office of Shanxi government. In January 2011, he was named acting mayor of Jincheng, replacing . He was installed as mayor in April of the same year. In February 2013, he was named acting mayor of Yuncheng, concurrently holding the Deputy Party Secretary position. In May 2016, he was appointed Party Secretary of Lüliang, but having held the position for only six months. In November 2016, he was transferred to Taiyuan, capital of Shanxi, where he was appointed deputy head of the Propaganda Department of the CPC Shanxi Provincial Committee. He was admitted to member of the standing committee of the CPC Shanxi Provincial Committee, the province's top authority.

In November 2017, he was assigned to the similar position in the neighboring Shandong province. He briefly served as secretary general of the CPC Shandong Provincial Committee. In January 2019, he was transferred to the coastal city Qingdao and appointed Party Secretary.

In January 2021, he was appointed Deputy Party Secretary of Anhui and party branch secretary of the provincial government. On February 1, he was elected governor on the 4th session of the 13th Anhui People's Congress. His predecessor Li Guoying was transferred to Beijing, capital of China, and appointed minister of Water Resources.

References

1963 births
Living people
People from Handan
Nankai University alumni
People's Republic of China politicians from Hebei
Chinese Communist Party politicians from Hebei
Governors of Anhui
Mayors of Yuncheng
Mayors of Jincheng
Delegates to the 12th National People's Congress
Delegates to the 13th National People's Congress